Margaret Olrog Stoddart (3 October 1865 – 10 December 1934) was a New Zealand artist.

Early life and education

Stoddart was born in Diamond Harbour, Canterbury, New Zealand in 1865, one of six children born to Mark Pringle Stoddart (1819-1885) and Anna Barbara (née Schjott). Her grandfather (Mark Stoddart's father) was Admiral Pringle Stoddart a famous British Royal Navy officer. Her uncle was the Scottish poet Thomas Tod Stoddart. The family moved back to Scotland in 1876, and Stoddart attended Edinburgh Ladies' College there.  When she was 14 her family returned to New Zealand, moving to Fendalton in Christchurch.

When the Canterbury College School of Art (now known as the Ilam School of Fine Arts) opened in 1882, she enrolled, completing her studies in 1890. She was awarded the Second Grade Full Certificate. During this period she became a member of the Palette Club, an association of artists who were committed to working from nature.

Career
Stoddart began establishing a reputation as one of the country's foremost flower painters, and in 1885 was elected to the council of the Canterbury Society of Arts. In 1886 and 1891 she visited friends in the Chatham Islands. Her travels were recorded in an album which was later presented to the Canterbury Museum.

Respected institutions began buying her work. In 1885 the Canterbury Society of Arts bought two of her flower paintings for its permanent collection. In 1890, 12 of her botanical paintings were acquired by the Canterbury Museum. She also exhibited at the Auckland Society of Arts in 1892. In 1894 she travelled to Melbourne, where with support from Ellis Rowan, the Australian flower painter, she held a successful exhibition.

Around 1898 Stoddart sailed for England. She stayed in London before moving to live at St Ives in Cornwall, at the time hosting a colony of artists. She spent over nine years painting in Europe, living not only in England, but also France and Italy. Shortly after her arrival, in 1898 or 1899, she went to Norway. She visited France and spent almost a year in Italy in 1905/06. She took lessons from Norman Garstin, Louis Grier and Charles Lasal amongst others and was strongly influenced by the Impressionist movement.

In England, Stoddart intermittently met up with Frances Hodgkins, another expatriate artist. In 1903 the two worked together in the English village of Bushey in Hertforshire. Stoddart exhibited with the Royal Institute in London, the Society of Aquarellists in Rome, and in Paris she showed at the Salon of the Société des Artistes Français and the Société Nationale des Beaux-Arts. At an exhibition in 1902 at the Baillie Gallery, London, her work was singled out for praise by The Sunday Times. Before leaving for New Zealand she exhibited at the Royal Academy of Arts and with the Society of Women Artists.

Stoddart returned to New Zealand in November 1906 and went to live with her mother and sister. In 1913 she moved to with her family to Christchurch. Apart from a trip to Australia and Tahiti in about 1926 she remained in New Zealand for the rest of her life.

In later years Stoddart was a member of the Christchurch Sketch Club, vice president of the Canterbury Society of Arts and taught at the Canterbury College School of Art. She influenced many other younger artists through her teaching. Nelson artist Sir Toss Woollaston was a pupil as was Evelyn Page.

Stoddart died in Hanmer Springs, North Canterbury, of a heart attack on 10 December 1934. Her passing was marked by major retrospective exhibitions of her work in Christchurch, Wellington and Auckland in 1935.

References

Gallery

External links

 Paintings by Margaret Stoddart held by Museum of New Zealand Te Papa Tongarewa

1865 births
1934 deaths
People from Banks Peninsula
People educated at the Mary Erskine School
Ilam School of Fine Arts alumni
New Zealand painters
New Zealand women painters
Botanical illustrators